Anna Starmach (born 15 May 1987 Krakow) is a Polish cook, author of cookbooks, and a culinary portal. She gained recognition thanks to being a judge on the Polish editions of MasterChef and MasterChef Junior.

Life 
She is the daughter of Teresa and Andrzej Starmach, historians and art collectors, and owners of the Starmach Gallery.

She studied art history at the Jagiellonian University . She graduated with honors from Le Cordon Bleu .

She completed internships in renowned restaurants, in the French Lameloise, in Krakow's Ancora, and the  Stary Hotel restaurant.

In 2010, she was a McCormick Polska ambassador, presenting the preparation of dishes from a bag. She won the "Cook for everything" competition organized by Dzień Dobry TVN. On TVN Style, she hosts his own program Pyszne 25 , in which she prepares a dish for PLN 25 in 25 minutes. The following books were created on the basis of this series: Pyszne 25, Pyszne. A new batch of recipes or Delicious for any occasion. She also hosts the Healthy Day! program on RMF Classic.

In 2016, she won the Star of the Pleiades statuette in the category "Metamorphosis of the year" during the Gala of the Pleiades Stars

Personal life 
On 2 September 2017, she married Piotr Kusek. They have two children.

Works 

 Pyszne 25 (Znak Literanova 2013).
 Pyszne 25. Nowa porcja przepisów (2014)
 Pyszne na każdą okazję (2014)
 Lekkość (2015)
 Pyszne na słodko (2015)
 Pyszności (2016)
 Pyszne obiady (2017)

References

External links 

 https://aniastarmach.pl/

Living people
1987 births